The large moth family Crambidae contains the following genera beginning with "M":

References 

 M
Crambid